The 2008–09 season was RC Lens's 103rd season in existence and the club's first season back in the second division of French football since 1990. In addition to the domestic league, Lens participated in this season's edition of the Coupe de France and the Coupe de la Ligue. The season covered the period from 1 July 2008 to 30 June 2009.

Players

First-team squad

Transfers

In

Out

Pre-season and friendlies

Competitions

Overview

Ligue 2

League table

Results summary

Results by round

Matches
The league fixtures were announced on 23 May 2008.

Coupe de France

Coupe de la Ligue

References

RC Lens seasons
Lens